Jaime Lusinchi served as President of Venezuela from 1984 to 1989 for Democratic Action.

Background
The adecos chose Jaime Lusinchi and Caldera once more stood up for his party COPEI. The divided socialists offered Teodoro Petkoff and José Vicente Rangel. Petkoff had broken with the Communist Party and, with the veteran leader Pompeyo Márquez, had founded in 1971 the Movement for Socialism (MAS in Spanish), which was more or less inspired by the Prague Spring, when Czech communists tried to liberalize their country in 1968. MAS was still Marxist but edging to left of center. Rangel was the son of a general during the Gómez autocracy, but he entered politics in 1958 as a moderate leftist. Rangel denounced the abuses of the adeco governments of Betancourt and Leoni—he accused them of allowing the secret police and the army to torture detainees—and he was the MAS presidential candidate in 1973 and 1978, both times doing badly. Teodoro was particularly disliked by adeco pardos. Teodoro was always trying to displace Rangel as his party's choice and finally, in 1983, the two men had a chance to test each other's popularity.

Much of the campaign was taken up by an "underground" debate about Lusinchi's mistress, Blanca Ibañez, and adecos insisted that his legal wife had simply "to bite the bullet". When the results were in, bipolarity worked and the adecos proved that they still had the pardos on their side by garnering 56% of the vote, the highest margin ever in a Venezuelan election. Caldera was down, but, as we shall see, definitely not out. But there were two novelties in the results: although Petkoff got more votes than Rangel, together they got 7% of the vote, which the left had never before achieved, although it is questionable whether Teodoro at that point was in any way the radical he had been before. Another result was that abstentions were 12% and this was significant because, as we saw, voting was compulsory in Venezuela and by and large Venezuelans had been very dutiful in this respect, and now they showed that not voting was catching on.

Presidency
Corruption had always been an issue in Venezuela, but under Lusinchi it became the main issue, and most Venezuelans considered that corruption, and not sheer incompetence, was the root of all of society's ills. Lusinchi had divorced his wife and married Blanca Ibañez, who was considered very influential behind the scene and was blamed for abuse of power and nepotism. The Venezuelan economy stagnated, and the country at the end of Lusinchi's regime was reportedly bankrupt. It would be reasonable to surmise that this should have been the end of bipolarity in the next elections, but it would be wrong. In the 1988 elections, the two ruling parties got a total of 93% of the vote. Petkoff fared very badly, but abstentions went up to 18%. The winner was none other than Carlos Andrés Pérez, for his second term. (In the Venezuelan constitution you could be re-elected as many times as you wanted as long as it wasn’t in successive elections.) The question was: How could a country whose descent into insolvency began with Pérez, who had botched so badly his first term, when corruption flourished as never before, have re-elected him with a majority that was barely less than the one Lusinchi got? This enigma has various explanations. That pardos were still adecos is an obvious one. The opposition to bipolarity did not have a leader is another. But especially, Venezuelans of all hues simply remembered that during Pérez's first term there had been a lot of money in circulation, things over-all had not been so dismal, and somehow they figured that Pérez could perform the miracle of making Venezuela "prosperous" again.

Lusinchi's cabinet (1984-1989)

References

History of Venezuela
Lusinchi, Jaime